Downs Gulch Aerodrome  is a privately owned aerodrome located  north of Downs Gulch, New Brunswick, Canada. This aerodrome is near an area of the Restigouche River valley known for its good salmon fishing; consequently, many private and charter aircraft use this strip as a means of accessing nearby lodges in areas such as Larrys Gulch. There is no available parking for aircraft, only a wider turn-around area mid-runway, so all aircraft must depart after dropping off their passengers.

References

External links
Page about this airport on COPA's Places to Fly airport directory

Registered aerodromes in New Brunswick
Transport in Restigouche County, New Brunswick
Buildings and structures in Restigouche County, New Brunswick